Marcha nupcial (English title: Bridal march) is a Mexican telenovela produced by Valentín Pimstein for Televisa in 1977.

Alma Muriel and Carlos Piñar starred as protagonists, while Blanca Sánchez starred as main antagonist.

Cast 
Alma Muriel
Carlos Piñar
Blanca Sánchez
Augusto Benedico
Rosario Granados
Elsa Cárdenas
Enrique Rocha
Ofelia Guilmáin
Roxana Saucedo
Gustavo Rojo
Aldo Monti
Lucía Guilmáin
Héctor Cruz

References

External links

Mexican telenovelas
1977 telenovelas
Televisa telenovelas
Spanish-language telenovelas
1977 Mexican television series debuts
1978 Mexican television series endings